Taste are an Irish blues rock band formed in Cork in 1966. They were founded by songwriter and guitarist Rory Gallagher who left the band in 1970.

History
Taste (originally "The Taste") was formed in Cork, Ireland, in August 1966 as a trio consisting of Rory Gallagher on guitars and vocals, Eric Kitteringham on bass, and Norman Damery on drums. In their early years Taste toured in Hamburg and Ireland before becoming regulars at Maritime Hotel, an R&B club in Belfast, Northern Ireland, in the summer of 1967.

In 1968 Taste began performing in the UK where the original lineup split up. The new lineup formed with Richard McCracken on bass and John Wilson on drums. The new Taste moved permanently to London where they signed with the record label Polydor. In November 1968, the band, along with Yes, opened at Cream's farewell concerts. While with Polydor, Taste began touring the United States and Canada with the British supergroup Blind Faith. In April 1969, Taste released the first of their two studio albums, the self-titled Taste, with On the Boards following in early 1970, the latter showing the band's jazz influences with Gallagher playing saxophone on numerous tracks. 

They performed at the Isle of Wight Festival 1970, alongside Jimi Hendrix and The Who. According to Donal Gallagher (Rory's brother who managed the band) filmmaker Murray Lerner had instructed his crew to shoot just two numbers from the new bands and to save the main film stock for Jimi Hendrix, The Who, Leonard Cohen and the other headliners, but Taste's performance prompted him to change his instructions: "Murray didn't know who Taste were but when he saw the spontaneity of the band and the audience and their interaction, he just told his guys keep filming and they just kept going and captured over an hour of the performance which was quite incredible." In the song "Sugar Mama", a photographer can be seen hurriedly bringing his camera up from a re-load to cover another camera angle.

Later in 1970 Taste toured Europe, then disbanded for numerous reasons, the details of which are still unclear, but are generally acknowledged as being related to managerial disputes, and tensions between Gallagher and the rest of the band, who wanted to be recognised as equals with him (Gallagher having been the sole songwriter in the band). They performed their last show on New Year's Eve in Belfast.  Wilson and McCracken immediately formed 'Stud' in early 1971, with Jim Cregan and John Weider, while Gallagher went on to pursue  a solo career. Some years after the break-up, recordings of the original line-up emerged.

A musical homage to Taste and Gallagher was made by Black 47 in their song "Rory", released on 1998's Green Suede Shoes album.

In 1996, Richard McCracken and John Wilson reformed the band with guitarist/vocalist Sam Davidson taking over Rory Gallagher's role as frontman, with Albert Mills replacing McCracken in 2010. The band continued in this formation until February 2017, when it was revealed that the band would tour under the name "Little Taste of Rory feat. John Wilson", and that the line-up now consisted of Wilson, Davidson, and new bassist Alan Niblock. In 2018 John Wilson retired from the band due to ill health but Sam Davidson continues to perform as "Sam Davidson's TASTE" with Albert Mills back on bass and Lyn McMullan taking over from Wilson on drums.

Personnel

Members

Current members
Sam Davidson – guitars, vocals 
Albert Mills – bass 
Lyn McMullan – drums 

Former members
Rory Gallagher – guitars, vocals, saxophone, harmonica 
Norman Damery – drums 
John Wilson – drums 
Eric Kitteringham – bass 
Richard McCracken – bass 
Alan Niblock – bass 

Timeline

Line-ups

Discography

Studio albums

Live albums

Compilation albums

Singles
 "Blister on the Moon" / "Born on the Wrong Side of Time" – UK, 1968 [a]
 "Born on the Wrong Side of Time" / "Same Old Story" – UK/ EU/ JPN, 1969
 "What's Going On" / "Railway and Gun" – EU, 1970 [b]
 "If I Don't Sing I'll Cry" / "I'll Remember" – ESP, 1970
 "Wee Wee Baby" / "You've Got to Play" – GER 1972
 "Blister on the Moon" / "Sugar Mama" / "Catfish" / "On the Boards" – UK 1982

notes:
 a^ - re-released in 1970 with the sides reversed.
 b^ - b/w "Morning Sun" in some countries.

DVDs
Message To Love – 1995 (Isle of Wight Festival recordings of "Sinner Boy" and "Gamblin' Blues" only)
What's Going On: Live At The Isle Of Wight - 2015

Bibliography 
 The New Musical Express Book of Rock, 1975, Star Books, 
 Cork Rock: From Rory Gallagher To The Sultans Of Ping by Mark McAvoy. Published by Mercier Press (2009)

References

External links
Has the covers of all singles, complete discography, everything
Gallagher life timeline
Taste live at Rodeo Club - Athens (Greek)

Irish rock music groups
Musical groups established in 1966
Musical groups disestablished in 1970
Musical groups from Cork (city)
Polydor Records artists
Verve Records artists
1966 establishments in Ireland
Irish musical trios